Prima is a Russian brand of cigarettes that was manufactured at the Kyiv Tobacco Factory in the Ukrainian Soviet Socialist Republic since 1970. Today, it is owned and manufactured in Russia by various tobacco manufacturers.

History
Prima cigarettes were created by the leadership of the German Labor Front (DAF) during the occupation of Ukraine by Germany in the Second World War; the target market was guest workers. The tutu was painted with colors of fascist symbols and the name was written in the German Blackletter font. In 1970, these cigarettes were produced again in the Soviet Union, becoming popular because of their low price (just 14 kopeyki) and the quality of their tobacco compared to another popular Russian brand, Belomorkanal. Prima cigarettes are now produced by a number of tobacco factories throughout Russia.

Markets
Prima cigarettes are sold in the following countries: Moldova, Transnistria, the Estonian Soviet Socialist Republic, Latvia, Lithuania, the Byelorussian Soviet Socialist Republic, Belarus, Ukraine, the Soviet Union, Russia,  Georgia, Armenia, Azerbaijan, Kazakhstan, Israel and Indonesia.

See also
 Tobacco smoking

References

External links
 Фото и описание сигаретных пачек Прима

Russian cigarette brands
Soviet brands